Colombia competed at the 2012 Summer Olympics in London, from 27 July to 12 August 2012. This was the nation's eighteenth appearance at the Olympics, having not competed at the 1952 Summer Olympics in Helsinki.

Comité Olímpico Colombiano sent the nation's largest delegation to the Games, surpassing the record by having more than a quarter more athletes than represented Colombia in Beijing. A total of 104 athletes, 48 men and 56 women, competed in 18 sports. Women's football was the only team-based sport in which Colombia was represented in these Olympic Games. There was only a single competitor in fencing, shooting, table tennis, taekwondo and triathlon.

This was Colombia's most successful Olympics (until Rio 2016), winning a total of eight medals (one gold, three silver, and four bronze). BMX rider and world champion Mariana Pajón, who was Colombia's flag bearer at the opening ceremony, won the nation's first gold medal since the 2000 Summer Olympics. Freestyle wrestler Jackeline Rentería became the first Colombian female athlete to claim two Olympic medals, while triple jumper Caterine Ibargüen won the nation's second medal in the track and field after 20 years. Other notable accomplishments included the nation's first ever Olympic medals in road cycling, judo and taekwondo.

Medalists

| width="78%" align="left" valign="top" |

| width="22%" align="left" valign="top" |

Competitors

Archery

Colombia has qualified for the following events

Athletics

Colombian athletes have so far achieved qualifying standards in the following athletics events (up to a maximum of 3 athletes in each event at the 'A' Standard, and 1 at the 'B' Standard):

Key
 Note – Ranks given for track events are within the athlete's heat only
 Q = Qualified for the next round
 q = Qualified for the next round as a fastest loser or, in field events, by position without achieving the qualifying target
 NR = National record
 N/A = Round not applicable for the event
 Bye = Athlete not required to compete in round

Men
Track & road events

* Palomeque was initially suspended and later excluded from the games after testing positive for exogenous testosterone.

Field events

Women
Track & road events

Field events

Boxing

Colombia has qualified boxers in the following events.

Men

Cycling

Colombia has so far qualified cyclists for the following events

Road
Colombia has qualified three places in the men's road race, subsequently filled by Fabio Duarte, Sergio Henao, and Rigoberto Urán. Urán only competed in Beijing before, but was unable to finish the race. A large breakaway – which at its peak contained 32 riders – formed off the front of the peloton early on in the race. No Colombians were part of the initial move, but Henao and Urán joined later on in the race. The peloton, led by the Great Britain Team, kept the breakaway relatively closer for the latter  of the race. As the race reached its end, however, the peloton could not close the gap to the large leading breakaway. Clearly, the breakaway would contain the eventual winner, and as the breakaway went under  to go in the race, the riders began to attack. Urán and Kazakhstan's Alexander Vinokourov were the first two riders to mount a sizeable distance between the main breakaway and themselves. As Urán and Vinokourov worked together to stay away, the main breakaway did not work collectively to pull back the two leading riders. With 200 meters left in the race, Urán swept across to the left side of the road until Vinokourov's attack became good enough to win the race. Urán, however, crossed the line in second place, earning him the silver medal. Sergio Henao crossed the line in sixteenth place with the main breakaway, while the other Colombian Fabio Duarte did not finish the course.

Track
Sprint

Team sprint

Pursuit

Keirin

Omnium

Mountain biking

BMX

Diving

Colombia has qualified in the following events.

Men

Equestrian

Jumping
Colombia has qualified two individual quota places through the 2011 Pan American Games

Fencing

Colombia has qualified 1 fencer.
Women

Football

The Colombian women's football team are qualified for the event.

 Women's team event – 1 team of 18 players

Women's tournament

Team roster

Group play

Gymnastics

Artistic
Men

Women

Judo

Sailing

Colombia has so far qualified 1 boat for each of the following events
Men

M = Medal race; EL = Eliminated – did not advance into the medal race

Shooting

Colombia has qualified 1 shooter

Men

Swimming

Colombia has qualified one athlete so far to compete in swimming by making the A standard. Another athlete completed its nation's full roster by achieving their respective Olympic Selection time (up to a maximum of 2 swimmers in each event at the Olympic Qualifying Time (OQT), and potentially 1 at the Olympic Selection Time (OST)):

Men

Women

Table tennis

Colombia qualified one athlete.

Taekwondo

Colombia has qualified 1 man.

Tennis

Colombia has qualified four tennis players.

Triathlon

Weightlifting

Colombia has qualified 4 men and 4 women.

Men

Women

Wrestling

Colombia has qualified three quota place.

Key
  – Victory by Fall.
  – Decision by Points – the loser with technical points.
  – Decision by Points – the loser without technical points.

Women's freestyle

See also
Colombia at the 2011 Pan American Games

References

External links

Nations at the 2012 Summer Olympics
2012
2012 in Colombian sport